The women's 1500 metres event at the 2015 Summer Universiade was held on 10 and 12 July at the Gwangju Universiade Main Stadium.

Docus Ajok of Uganda was pulled out of the 1500 metres heats because of the close proximity to the 800 metres final to which she had originally advanced. However, she was later disqualified for a lane violation in the semifinal of that event and the organizers decided to let her compete in the 1500 metres final despite not appearing in the heats. Ajok ended up winning the gold medal.

Medalists

Results

Heats
Qualification: First 4 in each heat (Q) and next 4 fastest (q) qualified for the semifinals.

Final

References

1500
2015 in women's athletics
2015